Hilter is a railway station located in Hilter, Germany. The station is on the Osnabrück–Brackwede railway. The train services are operated by NordWestBahn.

Train services
The station is served by the following services:

Local services  Osnabrück - Halle (Westf) - Bielefeld

References

Railway stations in Lower Saxony